Mark David Monington (born 21 October 1970) is an English former professional footballer who played as a central defender.

References

Mark Monington Boston United Roll Call stats

1970 births
Living people
People from Bilsthorpe
Footballers from Nottinghamshire
English footballers
Association football defenders
Burnley F.C. players
Rotherham United F.C. players
Rochdale A.F.C. players
Boston United F.C. players
Halifax Town A.F.C. players
English Football League players